The Nokia 6700 Slide is a mobile phone released by Nokia in May 2010.  It has many of the features associated with "smartphones," including email and web browsing, 3G connectivity, and an operating system (Symbian S60) that provides access to a wide variety of downloadable "apps."  However, the form factor of the phone is a "slider" form with a futuristic metallic look. The result is an attempt at stylish appearance, distanced from the chunky "smartphone" forms, while still retaining strong networked function.

Despite it having a similar name to the Nokia 6700 classic, the two phones are unrelated and have little in common with each other. In terms of specifications and operating systems, the Nokia 6700 slide is more similar to the Nokia C5-00.

References

External links 
 Nokia's Official 6700 Slide product page
 Nokia 6700 Slide Network
 GSM Arena's Full 6700 Slide Specifications
 Nokia 6700 Slide For Dummies: Resources and Discussion for the 6700 Slide

Nokia smartphones
Mobile phones introduced in 2010
Slider phones